Urge was an discontinued online music distribution service run by MTV Networks (now Paramount Media). Urge was integrated into Windows Media Player 11.

Urge was first launched on May 17, 2006. Downloaded files came with restrictions on their use, enforced by Windows Media DRM, Microsoft's digital rights management. Urge featured the music programming of MTV, CMT (country), and VH1 and provided editorial content for the online music service. Urge charged 99¢ a track, or $9.95/month for a subscription. An optional $14.95/month to-go subscription was available for those with PlaysForSure devices. As of May 2008, Urge was not compatible with Microsoft's Zune or Apple's iPod, although the first-generation Zune Marketplace was based on Urge, and had many similarities.

In Spring 2007, MTV Networks launched the digital audio radio service Urge Radio, available through cable operators. Urge Radio offered cable systems digital audio channels with non-stop music, commercial-free, 24 hours a day. Similar to Music Choice, song and artist info is displayed on the TV screen.

In August 2007, MTV Networks announced plans to end its partnership with Microsoft and joined by RealNetworks on its Rhapsody digital music store.

In September 2010, Verizon and Frontier informed their customers that they would be removing Urge channels due to the provider's commitment to shut down the service.

Features

Music downloads
At close, Urge had about 2.4 million songs available for download. Fans could download music for 99¢ a song or via one of the two subscription tiers. Subscription downloads allowed playback on three computers (also two PlaysForSure devices with the premium Urge To Go subscription). Devices and computers could be de-authorized through the account settings in Windows Media Player, allowing subscribers to change devices or computers. Subscribers may only de-authorize one PC and one device every 30 days.

There were several differences between songs downloaded through the subscription program and songs purchased though Urge. Purchased songs could be played repeatedly, regardless of whether the purchaser was still an Urge subscriber. Subscription music, on the other hand, became unplayable if the subscription lapsed. Subscription music also could not be burned to a CD while purchased music could. Additionally, purchased music could be copied to any WMA-enabled portable media player, not just those that are compatible with subscription services.

Urge To Go
Urge To Go was Urge's premium subscription service, allowing customers to sync all music downloaded from Urge to two PlaysForSure compatible devices. This is not compatible with Microsoft's Zune.

Internet radio
There were 36 free radio stations that can be accessed by anyone with Urge configured in Windows Media Player 11. With a subscription to Urge, 102 additional radio stations were available, providing a total of 138 radio stations as of July 2007.

Music videos
Streaming music videos were provided for the Urge service by MTV, VH1 and CMT. Songs which have corresponding videos are indicated by an icon to the left of the song title in Urge.

Auto-Mix, playlists and blogs
Urge provided several features to assist in discovering new music. The My Auto-Mix feature dynamically creates a playlist based on music each listener plays or adds to their library. Alternatively, playlists could be created based on mood, style or artist. Users can fine tune the results using three sliders for "popularity", "freshness" and "familiarity".

There were also playlists based on music, genres, celebrities, TV shows on MTV, VH1 and CMT and popularity.

In addition, Urge had 20 Informer blogs, which highlighted music from the three major networks (MTV, VH1 and CMT) as well as music from diverse genres in between from Afrobeat to Zydeco.

Urge and Rhapsody merger
In August 2007, Urge informed its user base that the service would soon merge with the Rhapsody music service run by RealNetworks. On Friday October 26, 2007, the integration between Windows Media Player and Urge was removed. Current subscribers to the Urge subscription services (Urge All Access and Urge All Access To Go) were automatically transferred to Rhapsody, thus requiring the subscriber to download the Rhapsody software to access and use their account.

Any subscription tracks downloaded with the Urge music service in Windows Media Player (as with any subscription based track) require that the media usage rights be updated every month for the track to be operable. As a result, subscription tracks downloaded to Windows Media Player using Urge will expire and the media usage rights will no longer be updated. A subscription based user will have to install the Rhapsody software, re-download their tracks and maintain their usage rights in the Rhapsody software as well as use Rhapsody to search for new music. It is possible to change the preferences in Rhapsody to download tracks in .WMA format thus making those tracks playable in Windows Media Player.

Urge users that paid by the track own the media rights, but without any problems using Windows Media Player to play those songs.

MTV Networks, Rhapsody, and Verizon Wireless are partnering to integrate the VCAST Music service into Rhapsody as well, thus enabling users to take advantage of their Rhapsody account on their mobile device.

Response
The music service was reviewed in several places. A CNET review gave the service a 7.0 on a 10-point scale. However, Urge has been criticized because it installs new "features" without the user's consent.

Urge and Rhapsody merger
In August 2007, Urge informed its user base that the service would soon merge with the Rhapsody music service run by RealNetworks. On Friday October 26, 2007, the integration between Windows Media Player and Urge was removed. Current subscribers to the Urge subscription services (Urge All Access and Urge All Access To Go) were automatically transferred to Rhapsody, thus requiring the subscriber to download the Rhapsody software to access and use their account.

Any subscription tracks downloaded with the Urge music service in Windows Media Player (as with any subscription based track) require that the media usage rights be updated every month for the track to be operable. As a result, subscription tracks downloaded to Windows Media Player using Urge will expire and the media usage rights will no longer be updated. A subscription based user will have to install the Rhapsody software, re-download their tracks and maintain their usage rights in the Rhapsody software as well as use Rhapsody to search for new music. It is possible to change the preferences in Rhapsody to download tracks in .WMA format thus making those tracks playable in Windows Media Player.

Urge users that paid by the track own the media rights, but without any problems using Windows Media Player to play those songs.

MTV Networks, Rhapsody, and Verizon Wireless are partnering to integrate the VCAST Music service into Rhapsody as well, thus enabling users to take advantage of their Rhapsody account on their mobile device.

List of Urge channels

 Acoustic Chill
 Adult Rock
 Alternative Rock
 Arena Rock
 Axis
 Blast
 Blue Room
 Bluegrass Radio
 Blues Part 2
 Christian
 CMT Radio
 CMT Wide Open Country
 Cinema
 Classic Country
 Classic R&B
 Classic Rap (uncensored)
 Classic Rock (uncensored)
 Celebration
 Comedy (uncensored)
 Cover to Cover
 Crescendo
 Crunch
 Dance Club
 Discotech
 Dope
 Dream Sequence
 Easy Listening
 Electronica
 Gospel
 Grind (Rhythmic Top 40)
 Hip-nod-ics
 I Love the '70s
 I Love the '80s
 I Love the '90s
 Jazzup Broadway
 Jazz Standards
 Jet Set
 Lounge Beats
 Latin Jazz
 Latin Hip-Hop
 Modern Pop
 Modern Rap
 Modern Soul
 MTV2 (Rock)
 MTV2 Headbangers Ball
 MTV Tr3s
 Manteca
 Meditation
 Neon
 Nick Kids
 Noggin
 NuGroove
 Oasis
 Opera Babylon
 Pegao
 Plush
 Pop Standards
 Praise
 R&B Hits
 Radio Alterna
 Ragga
 Reggae
 Reunion
 Rock Legends
 Rocks
 Say it Loud
 Showcase
 Smoke
 Smooth Jazz
 Soft Pop
 Solid Gold Oldies
 Soul City
 Swing
 Today's Top 40
 TRL
 Tejano
 Ultrasound
 Unforgettable
 VH1 Soul
 Vinyl
 Voice Box
 Zen

References

External links
 Feeling the “URGE,” MTV Networks Announces a New Digital Music Service in Collaboration With Microsoft a press release from Microsoft (December 13, 2005)
 MTV to Start Music Service with Microsoft, from the New York Times (December 13, 2005)
 MTV Urge review by CNET (May 14, 2006)
 I don’t want my MTV from Ed Bott's blog at ZDNet (May 16, 2006)
 PC Magazine Review (November 15, 2006)
 URGE to Merge with RealNetworks' Rhapsody (August 21, 2007)

Online music stores of the United States
Paramount Media Networks